Woody Point is a coastal suburb of Redcliffe in the Moreton Bay Region, Queensland, Australia.

Along with its neighbouring coastal suburbs on the Redcliffe Peninsula, the suburb is a popular recreational destination within the Brisbane metropolitan area.

Geography 

The suburb is bounded by Moreton Bay to the east, Bramble Bay to the south, roughly by unnamed drain to the west and roughly by King Street to the north.

There are three headlands along the eastern coast of the suburb. At the southern tip is Woody Point, also known as Ningeryoun, first marked on a 1840s survey map by James Charles Burnett. Further north are:

 Picnic Point
 Scotts Point, which was probably named after surgeon Peter Walter Scott who was the storekeeper in Moreton Bay penal settlement between 1824 and 1926.

History

In 1799, Matthew Flinders landed on the peninsula and named the location Red Cliff Point after the colours in the cliffs. In 1823 the peninsula was selected as the site of Queensland's first (and only) penal colony (Moreton Bay penal settlement) but, after arriving in 1824 to establish the colony, problems with mosquitoes and the resistance from local Aboriginals caused the colony to relocate up the Brisbane River in 1825, founding the city of Brisbane.

Redcliffe developed as a small seaside retreat accessible only by boat from Brisbane while Woody Point was originally a banana plantation.

Woody Point Jetty was built in 1888. It was reconstructed during 2008 at a cost of $9.6 million.

When the Hornibrook Bridge opened in 1935 (later replaced by the Houghton Highway and Ted Smout Memorial Bridge ), it linked Brighton, the most north-eastern suburb in the City of Brisbane, across Hays Inlet to Clontarf on the Redcliffe Peninsula. By improving the road connection between them, Redcliffe then became much more accessible and grew as part of Brisbane's suburban sprawl.

A one-off 'high speed reliability trial' motor race was held in 1936, with a 4.2km (2.65 mile) circuit using the following streets in a clockwise direction: Oxley St-Duffield Rd-Ernest St-Albert St-Margate Pde-Whytecliffe Pde-Gayundah Esplanade-Lilla St-Alfred St. Competitors had to average fixed speeds over the 27 laps.

Our Lady of Lourdes School opened in 1969 and closed in 1995.

Woody Point Special School opened on 21 August 1978.

Southern Cross Catholic College (Woody Point Primary) opened in 2002, being formed by the amalgamation of three Catholic primary schools of the Peninsula, Brigidine College and De La Salle College.

In 1958, HMQS Gayundah was run aground at Woody Point to create a breakwater.

The foundation stone of St Mark's Anglican Church was laid at 46 Kate Street (corner of Annie Street) on Sunday 26 April 1953 by Archbishop Reginald Halse. The church was dedicated on 7 April 1957 by Archbishop Halse. It was consecrated on 28 April 1968 by Archbishop Philip Strong. In the 1990s it was decided to combine the congregations of St Mark's and St Barnabas in Clontarf into a new St Peter the Fisherman's Anglican Church at Clontarf. This led to the closure of St Mark's on 24 April 1993 which was approved by Assistant Bishop George Browning. St Peter the Fisherman's was dedicated in 1993. As at July 2020, the St Mark's site has been converted into a multi-unit dwelling but the foundation stone is still visible on the street corner.

Woody Point's Apex Park & Bicentennial Park were constructed by reclaiming land along the foreshore in the 1970s.

The median age of the Woody Point population was 46 years, 9 years above the national median of 37. 71.5% of people living in Woody Point were born in Australia. The other top responses for country of birth were England 6.3%, New Zealand 6.3%, Scotland 1.2%, South Africa 0.9%, Canada 0.6%. 89.3% of people spoke only English at home; the next most common languages were 0.6% Spanish, 0.4% Russian, 0.4% German, 0.4% French, 0.3% Dutch.

Heritage listings

Heritage-listed sites at Woody Point including Woody Point Memorial Hall along the Hornibrook Esplanade (.

Education 
Founded in 1995, Southern Cross Catholic College is a private primary to Year 12 Catholic school(headquartered at Scarborough) The college has 4 campuses. These are Kippa-Ring Primary Campus, Scarborough Primary Campus, Scarborough Secondary Campus and Woody Point Secondary Campus. The school's current principal is Mr Chris Campbell (2022). The Woody Point campus is at 84 Collins Street.

Woody Point Special School is a special primary and secondary (Early Childhood-12) school for boys and girls at 85 Georgina Street. In 2018, the school had an enrolment of 86 students with 33 teachers (25 full-time equivalent) and 48 non-teaching staff (33 full-time equivalent). It offers an early childhood special education program.

The nearest government primary schools are Humpybong State School in neighbouring Margate to the north and Clontarf Beach State School in neighbouring Clontarf to the west. The nearest government secondary school is Clontarf Beach State High School at Clontarf.

Amenities 
Woody Point's current renovations include the construction of high-rise apartment buildings overlooking Bramble Bay, Moreton Bay, The Port of Brisbane and the Ted Smout Highway. Until recently, restaurants and cafes were very limited in the suburb, however currently Woody Point boasts some of the most highly rated and recognised restaurants on the Redcliffe Peninsula including The Belvedere Hotel, Maple Cafe and Butcher, Baker, Coffeemaker.

The closest shopping centre is either Margate Village, some 2 km north or Bayside Plaza in Clontarf, some 3 km southwest. Woody Point accommodates localized convenience retail, a corner store, takeaways, a medical clinic and pharmacy & an Australian Post branch within its Woody Point Village.

The Clontarf branch of the Queensland Country Women's Association meets at the corner of Victoria Avenue and Georgina Street.

Bramble Bay Bowls Club is on the corner of Hornibrook Esplanade and Victoria Avenue.

Eildon Croquet Club is on the corner of the Hornibrook Esplanade and Oxley Avenue.

Other clubs on the point include the Redcliffe Outrigger Canoe Club and Humpybong Yacht Club.

Attractions
Woody Point Jetty is a  jetty at the point Woody Point with informative displays, seating and facilities for fishing.

The remains of the HMQS Gayundah can be seen at Picnic Point.

Other attractions include:
Bramble Bay foreshore including Bicentennial Park and Apex Park.
Launching point for fishing boats and the Humpybong yacht club.
Scott's Point and Gayundah coastal arboretum.
Bells Creek
Crockatt Park featuring BBQ and picnic area and great kids playground.

See also
Redcliffe Peninsula road network

References

External links

 

Suburbs of Moreton Bay Region
Pre-Separation Queensland